Scott Gordon (born February 21, 1977 in Ottawa, Ontario) is a former professional Canadian football safety who most recently played for the Edmonton Eskimos of the Canadian Football League in 2009. He retired from professional football on May 2, 2010. He played CIS football for the Ottawa Gee-Gees, winning the Vanier Cup in 2000, and junior football for the Ottawa Junior Riders, in the Quebec Junior Football League.

References

1977 births
Living people
Edmonton Elks players
Calgary Stampeders players
Hamilton Tiger-Cats players
Ottawa Gee-Gees football players
Canadian football people from Ottawa
Players of Canadian football from Ontario
Saskatchewan Roughriders players